Fashion Illustration is the art of communicating fashion ideas in a visual form that originates with illustration, drawing and painting and also known as Fashion sketching. It is mainly used by fashion designers to brainstorm their ideas on paper or digitally. Fashion sketching plays a major role in designing to preview and visualize designs before sewing actual clothing.

History
Fashion illustration has been around for nearly 500 years.  Ever since clothes have existed, there has been a need to translate an idea or image into a visual representation.  Not only do fashion illustrations show a representation or design of a garment but they also serve as a form of art. The majority of fashion illustrations were created to be seen at a close range, often requiring the illustrator to have an eye for detail. Fashion illustration is said to be a visual luxury.

More recently, there has been a decline of fashion illustration from the late 1930s when Vogue began to replace its celebrated illustrated covers with photographic images.  This was a major turning point in the fashion industry. Laird Borrelli, author of Fashion Illustration Now states,
Fashion Illustration has gone from being one of the sole means of fashion communication to having a very minor role. The first photographic cover of Vogue was a watershed in the history of fashion illustration and a watershed mark of its decline. Photographs, no matter how altered or retouched, will always have some association with reality and by association truth. I like to think of them [fashion Illustrations] as prose poems and having more fictional narratives. They are more obviously filtered through an individual vision than photos. Illustration lives on, but in the position of a poor relative to the fashion., 
Fashion illustration differs from the fashion plate in that a fashion plate is a reproduction of an image, such as a drawing or photograph, for a magazine or book. Fashion illustrations can be made into fashion plate, but a fashion plate is not itself an original work of illustration. 

In the modern day fashion illustrations are seen more as interpretations of garments rather than exact replicas. Illustrators have more freedom when working for themselves rather than for magazines, that valued realism over the illustrator's creative liberties.

Process of Fashion Illustration
Designers use mediums such as gouache, marker, pastel, and ink to convey the details of garments and the feeling invoked by the artist. With the rise of digital art, some artists have begun to create illustrations using Adobe Photoshop. Artists frequently begin with a sketch of a figure called a croquis, and build a look on top of it. The artist takes care to render the fabrics and silhouettes used in the garment. They typically illustrate clothing on a figure with exaggerated 9-head or 10-head proportions. The artist will typically find samples of fabric, or swatches, to imitate in their drawing.

Notable fashion illustrators

Notable active illustrators
 Meagan Morrison
 David Downton (1959–)
 Julie Verhoeven (1969-)
 Hayden Williams (1991-)

Notable Illustrators of the past 

Paul Iribe (1883–1935) 
Carl 'Eric' Erickson (1891–1958) 
'Erté' Romain de Tirtoff (1892-1990)
Christian Bérard (1902–1949)
Max Hoff (1903 – 1985)
Dagmar Freuchen (1907-1991)
Ruth Sigrid Grafstrom (1905-1986)
Rene Gruau (1909–2004) 
Irwin Crosthwait (1914–1981) 
Lila De Nobili (1916–2002) 
Bernard Blossac (1917–2002)
Kenneth Paul Block (1924–2009) 
Andy Warhol (1928–1987) 
Antonio Lopez (1943–1987) 
Joel Resnicoff (1948–1986)

Digital Fashion Illustrators 
Inga Sandweg (1985-)

Further reading
 " Le Premier siècle de René Gruau " by Sylvie Nissen & Vincent Leret. Published by Thalia Edition Paris. 2009. 
 An Illustrated History of Fashion: 500 Years of Fashion Illustration, by Alice Mackrell. Published by Costume & Fashion Press, 1997. .
 Fashion Illustration Next, by Laird Borrelli. Published by Chronicle Books, 2004. .
 New Fashion Illustration, by Martin Dawber. Published by Batsford, 2005. .
 Fashion Illustrator, by Bethan Morris. Published by Laurence King Publishing, 2006. .
 100 Years of Fashion Illustration,, by Cally Blackman. Published by Laurence King Publishing, 2007. .
 Essential Fashion Illustration: Details. , by Maite Lafuente. Published by Rockport Publishers, 2007. .

See also
 Illustration
 Fashion

References

External links
 Frances Needy Collection - information about research access  http://www.fitnyc.edu/library/sparc/collections/frances-neady.php
 Frances Needy Collection - SPARC Digital - https://sparcdigital.fitnyc.edu/items/browse?collection=26
 Victoria & Albert Museum - Fashion Drawing and Illustration - http://www.vam.ac.uk/content/articles/f/fashion-drawing-in-the-20th-century/

Drawing
Illustration

Fashion design
Fashion